Learn.com was a software company headquartered in Sunrise, Florida. Learn.com provided on-demand learning management and talent management software, and e-learning courses.

History
Learn.com was founded by Jim Riley and Patrick Toomey in January 1999 as a website that allowed anyone to create and publish e-learning courses or e-learning sites (called LearnCenters). Learn.com became an early example of a website containing open content.

In September 2000, Learn.com introduced the first commercial version of its LearnCenter LMS, with assistance of co-founder JW Ray.

In June 2001, Learn.com client ECOT became the first electronic charter school in the nation to graduate students.

In September 2002, Learn.com acquired Learn2 Corporation, a provider of e-learning content.

In June 2004, Learn.com acquired Mentor Communications, Inc.

In December 2005, Learn.com introduced LearnCenter X, the HCM industry's first integrated Talent management suite.

In September 2007, Learn.com introduced its WebRoom web conferencing product.

In June 2009, Learn.com introduced its Learn.com Personal Edition (LPE), a website that allows anyone to take courses and learn/improve skills or create and publish their own courses.

In October 2010, Learn.com was acquired by Taleo Corporation (NASDAQ: TLEO), a leader in the on-demand Talent Management market.  In April 2012, Taleo was in turn acquired by Oracle Corporation and Learn.com technology became the foundation for the Oracle Learn Cloud product.

Awards
In November 2009, Elearning! Magazine announced that Learn.com was the first winner in their newly created Best Talent Management System (TMS) category. Learn.com also won top honors for its Learning Management System (LMS) in this readers' choice award and continued the trend of Best Enterprise LMS recognition for a record fourth year in a row as the company had won top honors in 2006 from Training Magazine.

In January 2008, Elearning! Magazine announced that their readers had voted the Learn.com LearnCenter platform as the Best LMS for 2007. Elearning! Magazine voters also gave top honors to Learn.com's Information Technology (IT) and Soft Skills content libraries. Learn.com LearnCenter was voted one of the Best Enterprise LMS for 2007 and 2008.

See also
 Human Capital Management
 Learning Management System
 Performance Management

Notes

External links
 Company website

Learning management systems
Human resource management software
Software companies established in 1999
1999 establishments in Florida
Software companies based in Florida
Companies based in Broward County, Florida
Sunrise, Florida
2010 mergers and acquisitions
Defunct software companies of the United States